Elvis and Anabelle is an American romantic drama film written and directed by Will Geiger. It stars Blake Lively, Max Minghella, Joe Mantegna, Mary Steenburgen, and Keith Carradine. The film premiered on March 10, 2007, at the South by Southwest film and music festival in Austin, Texas, and later premiered on HBO in 2012.

Plot
Teen Elvis Moreau cares for his father Charlie and runs their funeral home. Charlie has been mentally handicapped for years, so Elvis took over operating the home. However, he doesn't have his embalming license, so Charlie officially performs the services. Elvis keeps photos of the finished corpses in a scrapbook.

Nearby, Anabelle Leigh is a pageant girl, living with her mother Geneva and alcoholic stepfather Jimmy. She has bulimia and Jimmy likely sexually abuses her. Geneva put her into beauty pageants very young, hoping they could have financial independence from men.

Moments after qualifying for the nationals, Anabelle's heart stops on stage. Sent to the Moreaus' Funeral Home, Elvis begins working on her. Entranced, he kisses her and he accidentally captures it on camera. A gust of wind bursts open the window, as he shuts it, Anabelle suddenly gasps awake. Shocked, he calls the police and wakes Charlie, reminding him he was working on Anabelle.

Anabelle is returned to Geneva and Jimmy very changed. She neither has an eating disorder nor is she interested in pageants, but Geneva still pressures her to continue.

Due to having constant flashbacks to when she woke up, Anabelle goes to at the Moreaus' to learn more about that night. Elvis turns her away, fearing she will find out he does the embalming. That night, she sneaks back by bike, to lay on the table to relive that night. Elvis confronts her, thinking somebody broke in, then Charlie comes in. Elvis reminds him to say he was the one working with Anabelle. Walking her out, she asks to stay until the dawn to bike home. She obviously does not want to go, so he lets her stay.

Anabelle and Elvis slowly become friends. She begins painting the house and he joins her. One morning, Elvis shows her the headline stating she's missing. Annoyed, she claims Geneva knows she ran away. Elvis fears the police may find her there, but she doesn't.

When Anabelle notices the field next to the house is empty, Elvis says nothing can grow there. She insists he help her buy seeds, keeping it a secret, saying it's "a miracle". While Anabelle's in the field, the police come by, looking for her. She's indifferent, as she's there willingly.

Anabelle and Elvis continue to bond. One night, on a walk they end up on the bridge where his mother committed suicide. After her death, Charlie started going on very long walks. On one of them he was disabled by a hit in the head with a beer bottle. Elvis doesn't believe in miracles as a result. Anabelle kissing him triggers another flashback and she pulls away.

Police return to the house, so when Anabelle and Elvis arrive Charlie is distraught. They know she was staying there, but he said she left. Anabelle decides to visit a far off friend, and Charlie tells Elvis to go with her. Initially not wanting to leave him alone, he is convinced, and they leave.
 
When Elvis and Anabelle finally reach their destination, she confesses she doesn't really have a friend here. Instead, they live on the beach for a few weeks, and they become intimate.

Police report to Geneva and Jimmy, when she asks them to search the house they can't as Anabelle ran away and wasn't kidnapped. So she goes to the Moreaus' herself to snoop around. Finding Anabelle's clothes and the photo of Elvis kissing her in the mortuary trash, she calls the police.

On the drive home, Elvis and Anabelle stop at a gas station, and both see newspapers with the photo and headlines accusing Elvis of necrophilia. Recognizing them, the cashier calls the police. Before Elvis can explain it to her, he is arrested.

Anabelle is returned to Geneva and Jimmy. In jail, Elvis tells the police the truth. A few days later, she visits him in jail. They argue and Elvis tells her what really happened. Shocked, not understanding how after that Elvis doesn't believe in miracles, she leaves.

Returning home, Elvis finds Charlie dead outside. With no will to live, he decides to hang himself. Just before, a gust of wind blows the house doors open, showing him Anabelle's miracle: a sunflower field. He barely saves himself, then runs outside to many reporters.

Meanwhile, Anabelle is also setting up her own suicide. Nudging a running TV towards her bath, right before she can electrocute herself, she sees Elvis painting "I love you Anabelle" on his house on TV.

Elvis walks into the sunflower field, laying down to look up at the flowers and the sky. Anabelle comes, and they look up at the sky together.

Cast
 Max Minghella as Elvis Moreau
 Blake Lively as Anabelle Leigh
 Joe Mantegna as Charlie Moreau
 Mary Steenburgen as Geneva Leigh
 Keith Carradine as Jimmy

Critical reception
A reviewer writing for Movieline praised the performances of Lively and Minghella, and called the film "a dark and dreamy slice of Southern gothic romance, having all the hallmarks of a cult film in the making, destined for Gen-Z status."

References

External links
 
 
 

2007 films
American romantic drama films
American romantic fantasy films
2007 romantic drama films
Films scored by Blake Neely
Goldcrest Films films
Films about beauty pageants
Films set in Texas
2000s English-language films
2000s American films